Paolo Prodi (3 October 1932 – 16 December 2016) was an Italian historian and politician.

Early life and education 
Born on 3 October 1932 in Scandiano, in the province of Reggio Emilia, he was one of the nine children of the engineer Mario Prodi and the elementary school teacher Enrichetta Franzoni. He was the brother of the politician, manager, and economist Romano Prodi, the professor and politician Vittorio Prodi, the physicist , the oncologist Giorgio Prodi, and the mathematician Giovanni Prodi. In 1945, at the age of 13, Prodi saw his parish priest killed, accused by the Italian partisans of wartime collaboration with Nazi Germany. After having won a scholarship at the Augustinianum College, he graduated in political science at the Università Cattolica del Sacro Cuore in Milan, and then completed his studies at the University of Bonn as a student of Hubert Jedin. Along with Jedin, he completed his study of the Council of Trent.

Career 
Prodi taught modern history at the University of Trento, of which he was the rector from 1972 to 1978 and dean of the Faculty of Letters from 1985 to 1988, the Sapienza University of Rome, and the University of Bologna, of which he was the dean of the Faculty of Teaching from 1969 to 1972. He was also president of the Giunta Storica Nazionale (formerly Giunta Centrale per gli Studi Storici) and a member of the Austrian Academy of Sciences and Accademia Nazionale dei Lincei. In 1965, he was one of the founders of the cultural and political association , with which he published several of his major works, such as Giuseppe Dossetti e le Officine bolognesi, Il sacramento del potere. Il giuramento politico nella storia costituzionale dell'Occidente, Il Sovrano Pontefice. Un corpo e due anime, Il tramonto della rivoluzione, Settimo non rubare, Storia moderna o genesi della modernità?, and Una storia della giustizia. Dal pluralismo dei fori al moderno dualismo tra coscienza e diritto.

In 2007, he was awarded the Alexander von Humboldt Prize. In the 1992 Italian general election, Prodi was a candidate for Leoluca Orlando's The Network; he later abandoned this movement, in disagreement with Orlando's stance in favour of the abrogative referendum proposals that were subjected to popular approval in the 1993 Italian referendum.

Personal life and death 
Prodi was married to Dede since 1969. They had four children: Giovanni, Gabriele, Marta, and Mario, all of whom grew up in Bologna. Prodi died in Bologna on 16 December 2016 at the age of 84. The building of the Department of Letters and Philosophy of the University of Trento was named after him. The family donated his archive to the university.

Works

Honours

Italy 
  Grand Official of the Supreme Order of the Most Holy Annunciation, 1975.
  Italian Medal of Merit for Culture and Art, 1976.
  Italian Medal of Merit for Culture and Art, 1987.

Foreign 
  Cross 1st Class of the Order of Merit of the Federal Republic of Germany, 1992.
  Austrian Decoration for Science and Art, 1994.

References

Further reading

External links 
 Curriculum e attività di ricerca – Prof. Paolo Prodi at Uninettuno (in Italian)
 Giunta Storica Nazionale at Giunta Storica Nazionale (in Italian)
 Interventi di Paolo Prodi at Radio Radicale (in Italian)
 ISIG – Institute of International Sociology at The Institute of International Sociology of Gorizia (in English)
 Paolo Prodi at BeWeb of the Episcopal Conference of Italy (in Italian)
 Paolo Prodi at Camera.it (in Italian)
 Le sedi at University of Trento (in Italian)
 Storia dell'Ateneo – I primi 50 anni dell'Università di Trento at University of Trento (in Italian)

1932 births
2016 deaths
Deputies of Legislature XI of Italy
Italian historians
Italian politicians
The Network (political party) politicians
People from Scandiano
Università Cattolica del Sacro Cuore alumni